The Florey Lecture was a lecture organised by the Royal Society of London.

List of lecturers

References 

Biology education in the United Kingdom
Royal Society lecture series